James Schiller (born 14 July 2001) is an Australian rugby league footballer who plays as a er or  for the Canberra Raiders in the NRL.

Background
Schiller is the nephew of former Canberra Raiders player Brett Mullins, cousin of Bulldogs player Jack Hetherington, and grandson of former Eastern Suburbs winger of the century Bill Mullins.

Playing career

2022
Schiller made his first grade debut in round 1 of the 2022 NRL season for Canberra against the Cronulla-Sutherland Sharks.
In round 18, Schiller scored two tries for Canberra in their 20-16 upset victory over Melbourne.

References

External links
Canberra Raiders profile

2001 births
Living people
Australian rugby league players
Canberra Raiders players
Rugby league wingers
Rugby league centres
Rugby league players from Young, New South Wales